Back Through Time is the third studio album by Scottish heavy metal band Alestorm. It was released on 3 June 2011 by Napalm Records and is the first Alestorm recording to feature Gareth Murdock on bass and Peter Alcorn on drums. The album is available in jewelcase, digipack, LP and special edition boxset formats which includes two bonus cover songs. Alestorm did a Back Through Time World Tour starting in Australia and New Zealand. The album reached number 42 on the German albums chart.

Track listing

Personnel 
 Christopher Bowes – lead vocals, keyboards
 Dani Evans – guitars, backing vocals
 Gareth Murdock – bass, backing vocals
 Peter Alcorn – drums

With:
 Lord Jaldaboath – narration (track 1)
 Ken Sorceron – co-lead vocals (11)
 Lasse Lammert – guitar solo (6), vibraslap
 Heri Joensen – guitar solo (10)
 Chris Jones – accordion
 Maria Odvody – violin
 Tobias Hain – trumpet
 Florian Frambach – trumpet
 Derek Fobaire – trombone
 Hans-Jørgen Martinus Hansen – whistles
 Brenden Casey – backing vocals
 Gordon Krei – orchestral arrangements, programming

Charts

References

External links 
Music video for 

2011 albums
Alestorm albums
Napalm Records albums